Rochester Midland Corporation is a closely-held specialty chemical manufacturing company headquartered in Ogden, New York. It has sales and operations in nearly seventy countries, production facilities in Ogden, New York, Aurora, Illinois. It was founded as Rochester Germicide in 1888.

References

Chemical companies of the United States
Companies based in Monroe County, New York
Chemical companies established in 1888
1888 establishments in New York (state)